Kim Hee-kyung (born 1967) is a former South Korean journalist and humanitarian served as President Moon Jae-in's second Vice Minister of Gender Equality and Family from 2019 to 2020.

For almost two decades from 1991 to 2009, Kim worked as a journalist for Donga Ilbo. Lee then worked in NGOs and civil societies - as a director of advocacy and a head of advocacy and programme at Save the Children Korea from 2010 to 2016, a director at the Ministry-funded Migrant Youth Foundation from 2015 to 2017 and a director at Korean Human Rights Policy Institute in 2017.

Lee first entered public service in 2018 when she was first appointed as President Moon's second Deputy Minister of Culture, Sports and Tourism - its third highest position. In 2019 she was reshuffled to deputy head of the Ministry of Gender Equality and Family. 

Furthermore, Kim translated Sal Khan's book in Korean and wrote several books. She is best known to the public through her book Weird Normal Family criticising the current norm of nuclear family for its direct and indirect violence on children.  

Kim holds two degrees: a bachelor in Anthropology from Seoul National University and a MBA from Loyola Marymount University.

References 

Living people
Seoul National University alumni
Loyola Marymount University alumni
1967 births
South Korean government officials
Children's rights activists